Russian occupation of Southern Ukraine may refer to:

Location
Russian occupation of Donetsk Oblast
Russian occupation of Kherson Oblast — Including Kherson
Russian occupation of Zaporizhzhia Oblast — Including Berdiansk, Melitopol, and Enerhodar
Republic of Crimea